The N13 road is a national primary road in Ireland, running in County Donegal in Ulster from Stranorlar to just outside Derry. This road connects Letterkenny to Sligo, Derry and onwards to other destinations.

Route

The route diverges from the N15 (from Sligo) at Stranorlar. The route north through Kilross includes a T Junction with the R236 and then runs, via the townland of Drumnacross, over the Burn Dale (a burn or small river, also known as the Burn Deele) just outside the village of Drumkeen and on to the Dry Arch Bridge, located east of Letterkenny with a roundabout. The N56 runs along the Port Road to Letterkenny town centre. A section of dual carriageway runs east to bring the N13 (and traffic from the N14) to Corkey, where the N14 begins, and heads southeastwards linking Lifford from the roundabout with the N13. The N13 continues near Lough Swilly  passing Manorcunningham northeast as single carriageway, passing along a bypass of Newtowncunningham and passing through Speenoge. The route turns east (with the R239 linking Buncrana) southeast at Bridgend to end at the border with Northern Ireland  becoming the A2 road northwest of Derry and linking the city centre, and over Craigavon Bridge to Waterside Railway Station in the Waterside.

As originally designated, the N13 continued along the present N56 into Letterkenny, the section from Stranorlar to Letterkenny being part of the N56.

Upgrades
 no upgrades of the N13 were planned. The majority of the route is demarcated by the National Roads Authority as "upgraded" on their National Roads 2006 Status map.

See also
Roads in Ireland 
Motorways in Ireland
National secondary road
Regional road

References

External links
Roads Act 1993 (Classification of National Roads) Order 2006 – Department of Transport

13
Roads in County Donegal